The Tacoma Stars were a professional indoor soccer franchise that played in the Major Indoor Soccer League from 1983 to 1992. The team holds the record for the largest crowd to witness an indoor soccer game with 21,728 people packing the Tacoma Dome to see Tacoma fall to the Dallas Sidekicks 4–3 (OT) in Game 7 of the 1986–1987 MISL Championship.  Tacoma was the only team in MISL history to defeat the perennial champion San Diego Sockers in a MISL playoff series.

A new team named after the MISL Stars began play in the Professional Arena Soccer League in 2003.  The team eventually dropped down to the minor league Premier Arena Soccer League and later Western Indoor Soccer League before moving to the Major Arena Soccer League in 2015.

Year-By-Year Record

References

External links
Tacoma Stars History Website 
Tacoma Stars in the PASL 

Defunct indoor soccer clubs in the United States
Major Indoor Soccer League (1978–1992) teams
Sports in Tacoma, Washington
Soccer clubs in Washington (state)
1983 establishments in Washington (state)
1992 disestablishments in Washington (state)
Association football clubs established in 1983
Association football clubs disestablished in 1992